The Byerley Stud Stakes is the sponsored title of two horse races in Britain:

The St Hugh's Stakes, run at Newbury in August
The Radley Stakes, run at Newbury in October